Gosseletinidae is an extinct family of sea snails, marine gastropod molluscs in the clade Vetigastropoda (according to the taxonomy of the Gastropoda by Bouchet & Rocroi, 2005).

Genera 
Genera within the family Glosseletinidae include: 
 Balbinipleura
 Glabrocingulum
 Globodoma
 Glyptomaria
 Gosseletina
 Kirchneriella
 Nodulispira
 Promourionia
 Trepospira

References

 Paleobiology Database info